Sergei Viktorovich Nevstruyev (born August 29, 1972) is a former Kazakh professional  ice hockey player and currently an ice hockey coach.

References

External links

1972 births
Living people
Sportspeople from Oskemen
Barys Astana captains
Barys Astana head coaches
Gornyak Rudny players
HK Neman Grodno players
Kazakhstani ice hockey coaches
Kazakhstani ice hockey defencemen
Soviet ice hockey defencemen
Kazzinc-Torpedo players
Asian Games gold medalists for Kazakhstan
Asian Games silver medalists for Kazakhstan
Medalists at the 1999 Asian Winter Games
Medalists at the 2003 Asian Winter Games
Asian Games medalists in ice hockey
Ice hockey players at the 1999 Asian Winter Games
Ice hockey players at the 2003 Asian Winter Games